EMH may refer to:

 Efficient-market hypothesis, a hypothesis in financial economics that states that asset prices reflect all available information
 Emergency Medical Hologram, a fictional computer program personified in the Doctor on Star Trek
 EMH Regional Medical Center, a hospital in Elyria, Ohio
 Extramedullary hematopoiesis, hematopoiesis occurring outside of the medulla of the bone